The Danzig Region (Regierungsbezirk Danzig) was a government region, within the Prussian Provinces of West Prussia and of Prussia. The regional capital was Danzig (Gdańsk). Prussian government regions were not bodies of regional self-rule of the districts and cities comprised, but shear top-to-down government agencies to apply federal or state law and supervise local entities of self-rules, such as municipalities, rural and urban districts.

History
Polish westerly Royal Prussia was annexed by the easterly Kingdom of Prussia during the late 18th century Partitions of Poland, with the city of Danzig becoming part of the Prussian Kingdom in 1793. The territory was administered in the new province of West Prussia (1772-1829, 1878-1920) and the new Province of Prussia (1829-1878).

In 1815, after the Napoleonic Wars, West Prussia was divided into the Regions of Marienwerder and Danzig.

West Prussia was reorganised into districts (Kreise) within each government region from 1815–18.

In 1887 a number of districts changed in the Danzig Region. Two more new districts were formed, the southern parts of the former Danzig District became part of the new Dirschau District. The northern areas of the Neustadt District were partitioned off to form the new .

As a result of World War I, the Treaty of Versailles allocated most of West Prussia to the Second Polish Republic, and the Danzig Region was dissolved in 1920. The city of Danzig and its environs became the Free City of Danzig. A few eastern areas of the Danzig Region remained in the Free State of Prussia in Weimar Germany, however. In 1920 the rural districts of Elbing and Marienburg in West Prussia as well as the city of Elbing were added to the truncated Marienwerder Region, which in 1922 was renamed as West Prussia Region for reason of tradition when it was transferred from the defunct Province of West Prussia to the Province of East Prussia.

Districts

Urban districts
Danzig formed an urban district from the beginning, Elbing reached that status in 1874 and was thus partitioned from Elbing Rural District, and several times enlarged on the expense of the surrounding rural district.

 1818-1920: Stadtkreis Danzig (Gdańsk); thereafter persisting as urban district within Free Danzig 
 1874-1920: Stadtkreis Elbing (Elbląg); thereafter persisting till 1945 as an urban district in Germany

Rural districts
The period when a district formed part of the Danzig Region is indicated by the years before the district names.

 1818-1920: Berent, seated in Berent in West Prussia (Kościerzyna);
 1818-1887: , seat: Russoschin (till 1828), Praust (till 1845), then Danzig; partitioned into the new districts of Danzig Heights, Lowlands and Dirschau 
 1887-1920: Danziger Höhe (Heights), seat: Danzig; the district persisted till 1939 as part of Free Danzig 
 1887-1920: , seat: Danzig; the district persisted till 1939 as part of Free Danzig 
 1772–1818, 1887-1920: Dirschau, seat: Dirschau (Tczew)
 1818-1920: , seat: Elbing; persisting till 1945 as a rural district in Germany, with its area west of the Nogat ceded to the new  in Free Danzig  
 1818-1920: Karthaus, seat: Carthaus/Karthaus in West Prussia (Kartuzy)
 1818-1920: Marienburg, seat: Marienburg (Malbork); persisting till 1945 as a rural district in Germany, with its area west of the Nogat ceded to Großes Werder district in Free Danzig 
 1818-1920: Neustadt, seat: Neustadt (Wejherowo) 
 1772-1920: Preußisch Stargard, seat: Preußisch Stargard (Starogard Gdański)
 1887-1920: , seated in Putzig (Puck); the district was partitioned from the Neustadt District, northern part

Demographics 
The Danzig region had a German majority population with significant minorities of Poles and Kashubians.

District presidents

Each of the nineteen Regierungsbezirke featured a non-legislative governing body called a Regierungspräsidium or Bezirksregierung (district government) headed by a Regierungspräsident (district president), concerned mostly with administrative decisions on a local level for districts within its jurisdiction.

Notes

References 
 Georg Hassel. Vollständige und neueste Erdbeschreibung der Preußischen Monarchie und des Freistaates Krakau. Weimar, 1819, pp. 577–586 (online).
 H. Oelrichs. Statistische Mitteilungen über den Regierungsbezirk Danzig. Danzig, 1867 (online).

1920 disestablishments
West Prussia
Government regions of Prussia
Region
States and territories established in 1815
1815 establishments in Prussia